Beethoven's 5th is a 2003 American family comedy film and is the fifth installment in the Beethoven film series. Daveigh Chase takes over the role of Sara which was originally played by Michaela Gallo in the previous two films. The film was released direct-to-video on December 2, 2003.

This was the final film of the original series, as the 2008 film, Beethoven's Big Break was a reboot of the character.

Plot
When Sara Newton and Beethoven are sent to spend the summer with Sara's uncle, clumsy mechanic Freddy Kablinski (her mom's brother) in an old mining town called Quicksilver, the mischievous Beethoven "digs up" a clue to the whereabouts of the legendary, hidden fortune of two bank robbers named Moe and Rita Selig. Now everyone wants to be his best friend as his discovery unleashes a frenzy of treasure hunting among the community's creatures. With help from Uncle Freddy and a boy named Garrett, Sara and Beethoven try to help uncover a secret that has been in the  little town for years.

Cast
 Dave Thomas as Freddy Kablinski
 Faith Ford as Sheriff Julie Dempsey
 Daveigh Chase as Sara Newton
 Tom Poston as John Giles/Selig
 Katherine Helmond as Cora Wilkens
 Sammy Kahn as Garrett
 Richard Riehle as Vaughn Carter
 Clint Howard as Owen Tuttle
 Kathy Griffin as Evie Kling
 John Larroquette as Mayor Harold Herman
 Rodman Flender as Moe Selig
 Tina Illman as Rita Selig
 Tom Musgrave as Jim
 Joel Hurt Jones as Phil Dobson
 Elizabeth Warner as Mrs. Dobson
 Cujo as Beethoven

Release
The film was released direct-to-video on December 2, 2003 in the United States and in May 2004 in the United Kingdom.

External links
 Beethoven's 5th at the Internet Movie Database
 

2003 films
2003 comedy films
American comedy films
Direct-to-video sequel films
Films about dogs
Films about pets
Universal Pictures direct-to-video films
Films about animals
Beethoven (franchise)
2000s English-language films
Films directed by Mark Griffiths (director)
2000s American films